Stuard is a surname. Notable people with the surname include:

 Brian Stuard (born 1982), American professional golfer
 Grant Stuard (born 1977), American football linebacker
 William "Sammy" Stuard (born 1954), American banker

See also
 Stuart (name)
 Suard